Farmers Branch, officially the City of Farmers Branch, is a city in Dallas County, Texas, United States. It is an inner-ring suburb of Dallas and is part of the Dallas–Fort Worth metroplex. Its population was 35,991 at the 2020 census.

Known as a "City in a Park" for its 28 parks in only 12 square miles, Farmers Branch is a small community in close proximity to Dallas, and has a business community that accounts for 80% of the city's tax base, allowing residents to have one of the lower city tax rates in Dallas County, while having dedicated city services and public safety.  

The city received media attention due to 2006 anti-illegal immigration measures and a law making English the city's official language. These measures were struck down by courts and/or repealed.

History

The community was first settled in the early 1850s. In 1842, Thomas Keenan, Isaac B. Webb, and William Cochran received original land grants in the area. By 1843, a community called Mustang Branch had been established. Mr. Cochran later changed the name to Farmers Branch to reflect the area's rich soil and farmland. Farmers Branch was the first location of the Texan Land and Emigration Company (or Peters Colony) in 1845. This made the community one of the best-known places in Dallas County during the 1840s because of its advertising throughout Europe and the United States. Baptist minister William Bowles opened a blacksmith shop and gristmill in 1845. On May 5, 1845, Isaac B. Webb donated land for Webb's Chapel Methodist Church, the first formal place of worship in Dallas County. A school was established in the church one year later. Webb became the first postmaster at the Farmers Branch post office, which opened on January 5, 1848. It continued to function until its closure in 1866. The post office reopened in 1875. To assure that railroads would eventually pass through Farmers Branch, prominent early settler Samuel Gilbert and others sold right-of-way through their land in 1874. Around three to four years later, the Dallas and Wichita Railway completed a track from Dallas—through Farmers Branch—to Lewisville. It was absorbed by the Missouri–Kansas–Texas Railroad in 1881. The community had a population around 100 by 1890, with several businesses. The population had grown to 300 during the early 1900s. A brick school building was constructed in 1916. The number of people living in the community remained stable until after World War II.

Farmers Branch was incorporated as a city after an election was held on February 23, 1946. William F. (Bill) Dodson was elected as the city's first mayor. The implementation of city services began immediately after incorporation. In the 1950 census, Farmers Branch had a population of 915. In 1956, a home-rule charter was approved that adopted a council-manager form of government. The rapid growth of the city during the 1950s was made apparent in the 1960 census, which recorded a total of 13,441 residents, a 1,369% increase over the 1950 figure. Most of the new residents commuted to nearby Dallas for employment. The population topped 27,000 by 1970. A variety of manufacturers producing items such as steel products, concrete, asphalt, cosmetics, and food products was operating in the city. The number of residents declined to 24,863 in 1980 and 24,250 in 1990. The falling population was offset, however, by the wide variety of businesses located in the city. Farmers Branch is home to a large number of corporations that have attained frontage along Interstate 635, the Dallas North Tollway, and Interstate 35E. Its Dallas North Tollway segment is part of the Platinum Corridor, and its land along Interstate 635 is an extension of the lengthy Irving Prairie office park. By 2000, the city's population had grown to 27,508. In 2017, the community elected the city's first millennial mayor, and by 2020 the city's population had grown to 35,991.

Geography

According to the United States Census Bureau, the city has a total area of 11.79 sq mi (30.54 km2) with only 0.08% (0.09 sq mi - 0.24 km2) covered by water.

Demographics

As of the 2020 United States census, there were 35,991 people, 16,015 households, and 10,119 families residing in the city.

Economy

According to  the city's 2018 Comprehensive Annual Financial Report  the top employers in the city are:

As of 2012, Farmers Branch had 3,500 companies. Celanese Corporation, Eyemart Express, I2 Technologies, OxyChem, and Varsity Brands have their headquarters in Farmers Branch. Maxim Integrated Products has an office in Farmers Branch. All Smiles Dental Centers formerly had its headquarters in Farmers Branch.
Excellence Health Inc. has an office in Farmers Branch that covers the Dallas life sciences cluster.

North Central Texas Council of Governments  2018 estimated total employment for the City of Farmers Branch is 78,393. The report is adjusted by the City of Farmers Branch finance department for businesses closed or moved prior to the reporting year.

Government

Politics

Local government

According to the city's most recent Comprehensive Annual Financial Report Fund Financial Statements, the city's various funds had $50.0 million in revenues, $64.5 million in expenditures, $33.8 million in total assets, $6.5 million in total liabilities, and $38.2 million in investments.

The structure of the management and co-ordination of city services is:

The city has its own police department.

Farmers Branch is a voluntary member of the North Central Texas Council of Governments association, the purpose of which is to co-ordinate individual and collective local governments and facilitate regional solutions, eliminate unnecessary duplication, and enable joint decisions.

Education

Public school districts

Residential areas in Farmers Branch are within two school districts.

Most of Farmers Branch is a part of the Carrollton-Farmers Branch Independent School District. Dave Blair Elementary School, Farmers Branch Elementary School, Janie Stark Elementary School, and Nancy H. Strickland Intermediate School (3–5) are in Farmers Branch. Sections zoned to Strickland for grades 3–5 are zoned to Neil Ray McLaughlin Elementary School (K–2) in Carrollton Vivian C. Field Middle School is in Farmers Branch and serves almost all of the CFBISD portion. R. L. Turner High School in Carrollton also serves almost all of CFBISD Farmers Branch. Residential areas south of Interstate 635 and west of Interstate 35E are zoned to La Villita Elementary School, Barbara Bush Middle School and Ranchview High School in Irving. CFBISD's Early College High School, an alternative high school, is on the property of Brookhaven College.

Dallas Independent School District also serves a small portion of Farmers Branch. One DISD elementary school, Chapel Hill Preparatory School, known as William L. Cabell Elementary School until its 2018 renaming, is in Farmers Branch. Its current name is a reference to the Chapel Hill community; it was renamed since the former namesake, Mayor of Dallas William Lewis Cabell, served in the Confederate States of America. Other residential portions of DISD Farmers Branch are served by Gooch Elementary. Residential areas in DISD are zoned to Marsh Middle School and W.T. White High School.

Mayor Tim O'Hare proposed making a new municipal Farmers Branch school district with the portions currently in CFBISD and DISD. In 2011, about 66% of voters decided against the referendum. At the time, the city did not have the 8,000 children required under Texas law as a requirement for forming a new district, so KTVT (CBS Dallas) stated, "Even if the proposal had passed, there would have been little, if anything, the city could have done to move forward".

Charter schools

Honors Academy, a charter school operator, has its administrative offices in Farmers Branch. The city hosted Branch Park Academy, a 6–8 charter school operated by Honors Academy.

Branch Park Academy was closed after the 2014–2015 school year, and the building has been leveled.

Private schools

Mary Immaculate Catholic School, a part of the Roman Catholic Diocese of Dallas, is in Farmers Branch. In addition, German International School of Dallas, established in 2009 and serving preschool and elementary school, is in the city limits.

Colleges and universities

The Texas Legislature defines all of Dallas County (Farmers Branch included) as in the service area of Dallas College, as well as all of CFBISD. Brookhaven College of Dallas College is in the Farmers Branch city limits.

Additionally Farmers Branch is home to Dallas Christian College, a four-year Bible college.

Weekend supplementary education

The Japanese School of Dallas, a supplementary Japanese school, previously had its main office in Farmers Branch. The school conducts its classes at Ted Polk Middle School in Carrollton. On Monday July 25, 2016 the Japanese Association and the Japanese School offices moved to a new location in Dallas. The classroom location remained the same.

Transportation

Farmers Branch was one of fifteen cities to approve services of Dallas Area Rapid Transit in 1983 by levying a 1 cent sales tax. The city currently receives DART bus service, with service to downtown Dallas (by both regular route and express bus), the adjacent suburb of Carrollton, and crosstown routes as well.

The city is between Interstate 35E to the west, the Dallas North Tollway on the east, and Interstate 635 to the south.

Sister cities

Farmers Branch maintains a sister city relationship with Bassetlaw, United Kingdom, and Garbsen, Germany.

References

External links

 City of Farmers Branch official website

Cities in the Dallas–Fort Worth metroplex
Cities in Texas
Cities in Dallas County, Texas
Populated places established in 1843
1843 establishments in the Republic of Texas